Robin Tihi (born 16 March 2002) is a footballer who plays as a defender for Värnamo on loan from AIK. Born in Sweden, Tihi represents Finland internationally.

Club career
On 26 January 2022, Tihi joined Värnamo on a season-long loan.

International career
Tihi was born in Sweden and is of Finnish and Moroccan descent. He originally represented the Sweden U16s, before switching to represents the  Finland U21.

Tihi made his full international debut from Finland on 12 January 2023, playing the full 90 minutes in a 0–1 friendly loss against Estonia.

Career statistics

Club

Notes

References

External links
AIK Profile

2002 births
Living people
People from Danderyd Municipality
Finnish footballers
Finland youth international footballers
Finland under-21 international footballers
Swedish footballers
Sweden youth international footballers
Finnish people of Moroccan descent
Swedish people of Finnish descent
Swedish people of Moroccan descent
Association football defenders
Vasalunds IF players
AIK Fotboll players
AFC Eskilstuna players
IFK Värnamo players
Allsvenskan players
Superettan players
Sportspeople from Stockholm County